The 2016 Kent State Golden Flashes football team represented Kent State University in the 2016 NCAA Division I FBS football season. They were led by fourth-year head coach Paul Haynes and played their home games at Dix Stadium as a member of the East Division of the Mid-American Conference. They finished the season 3–9, 2–6 in MAC play to finish in fifth place in the East Division.

Schedule

Schedule Source:

Game summaries

at Penn State

North Carolina A&T

Monmouth

at Alabama

Akron

at Buffalo

at Miami (OH)

Ohio

at Central Michigan

Western Michigan

at Bowling Green

Northern Illinois

References

Kent State
Kent State Golden Flashes football seasons
Kent State Golden Flashes football